Amherst Town Hall is a historic building in Amherst, Ohio. It was listed in the National Register of Historic Places on May 29, 1975.

See also
 Historic preservation
 National Register of Historic Places listings in Lorain County, Ohio
 Town hall

References

External links
 
 

City and town halls on the National Register of Historic Places in Ohio
Buildings and structures in Lorain County, Ohio
National Register of Historic Places in Lorain County, Ohio
City and town halls in Ohio